Jimmy Turner may refer to:
 Jimmy Turner (English footballer) (1866–1903), English footballer
 Jimmy Turner (American football) (born 1959), American football player
 Jimmy Turner (American soccer) (born 1989), American soccer player

See also
Jimmie Turner (born 1962), American football player
Jim Turner (disambiguation)
 James Turner (disambiguation)
 Turner (surname)